Banksia obovata, commonly known as wedge-leaved dryandra, is a species of shrub that is endemic to Western Australia. It has hairy stems, serrated, wedge-shaped to egg-shaped leaves with the lower end towards the base, cream-coloured or pale yellow flowers in heads of up to 100, and egg-shaped follicles. It is found in near-coastal areas in the south of the state.

Description
Banksia obovata is a shrub that typically grows to a height of  but does not form a lignotuber.

Taxonomy and naming
This species was first formally described in 1810 by Robert Brown in Transactions of the Linnean Society of London and was given the name Dryandra cuneata. The specific epithet (cuneata) is a Latin word meaning wedge-shaped.

In 2007, Austin Mast and Kevin Thiele transferred all dryandras to the genus Banksia. As there was already a plant named Banksia cuneata (matchstick banksia), Mast and Thiele chose the epithet obovata, meaning "inverted egg-shaped, in reference to the obovate leaves.

Distribution and habitat
Wedge-leaved dryandra occurs near the south coast of Western Australia between Narrogin, Albany and the Cape Arid National Park, including in the Stirling Range. It grows in kwongan.

References

obovata
Plants described in 1810
Taxa named by Robert Brown (botanist, born 1773)